Poticuara is a genus of longhorn beetles of the subfamily Lamiinae, containing the following species:

 Poticuara exilis (Bates, 1881)
 Poticuara ipiterpe Martins & Galileo, 1991

References

Hemilophini